The armless snake eel (Dalophis imberbis) is an eel in the family Ophichthidae (worm/snake eels). It was described by François Étienne Delaroche in 1809. It is a subtropical, marine eel which is known from the eastern Atlantic Ocean, including Spain, Mauritania, and the Mediterranean. It dwells at a depth range of 20–80 metres, and forms burrows in mud or sand. Males can reach a maximum total length of 150 centimetres.

The Armless snake eel's diet consists primarily of finfish and benthic invertebrates.

References

Ophichthidae
Fish described in 1809
Taxa named by François-Étienne de La Roche